Puthukkudiyiruppu may refer to:

Puthukkudiyiruppu (Mullaitivu), town in Mullaitivu District, Sri Lanka
Puthukkudiyiruppu (Batticaloa), town in Batticaloa District, Sri Lanka